Maria Vacratsis (born July 28, 1955) is a Canadian actress. She has been featured in several Canadian television series, including Degrassi: The Next Generation, Little Mosque on the Prairie, Tactical Girls, and Rent-a-Goalie. In addition to her work on television, she has appeared with Chris Farley and David Spade in the 1995 film Tommy Boy and as Aunt Frieda in My Big Fat Greek Wedding (2002) and its sequel My Big Fat Greek Wedding 2 (2016). She also voiced Queen Metaria (aka Negaforce) in the original English dub of Sailor Moon.

Filmography

Film

Television

References

External links

Canadian film actresses
Canadian television actresses
Canadian voice actresses
Living people
Place of birth missing (living people)
Canadian people of Greek descent
20th-century Canadian actresses
21st-century Canadian actresses
1955 births